Zharf or Jarf may refer to:
 Zharf, Kalat
 Zharf, Zaveh